Isabella Robertson (née McCorkindale)  (born 11 April 1936) is a Scottish golfer who won the British Ladies Amateur in 1981. Robertson represented Great Britain and Ireland in the Curtis Cup as a player on seven occasions and twice as non-playing captain.  She was inducted into the Scottish Sports Hall of Fame in 2002.

Career
Robertson learned to play golf at Dunaverty Golf Club in Argyll, Scotland.  She won the British Ladies Amateur title in 1981 at Conwy Golf Club in Caernarvonshire, Wales, having been runner-up three times: 1959 at Royal Ascot Golf Club, 1965 at St Andrews, and at Gullane Golf Club in 1970.  She won the Scottish Women's Amateur Championship on seven occasions.

Robertson represented Great Britain and Ireland as a player on seven occasions in the Curtis Cup (1960, 1966, 1968, 1970, 1972, 1982, 1986). She was a non-playing captain in 1974 and 1976.  On her ninth appearance in the competition, she experienced victory for the first time, beating the U.S. team 13–5 at the Prairie Dunes Country Club, Kansas in 1986.

Notable wins
 British Ladies Amateur – 1981
 Scottish Women's Amateur Championship – 1965, 1966, 1971, 1972, 1978, 1980, 1986
 New Zealand Ladies Amateur – 1981
 British Ladies Amateur Stroke Play Championship – 1971, 1972, 1985
 Helen Holm Scottish Women's Open Stroke Play Championship – 1973, 1978, 1986

Team appearances
Amateur
Curtis Cup (representing Great Britain & Ireland): 1960, 1966, 1968, 1970, 1972, 1974 (non-playing captain), 1976 (non-playing captain), 1982, 1986 (winners)
Vagliano Trophy (representing Great Britain & Ireland): 1959 (winners), 1963 (winners), 1967 (non-playing captain), 1969, 1971 (winners), 1981, 1985 (winners)
Espirito Santo Trophy (representing Scotland): 1964
European Ladies' Team Championship (representing Scotland): 1965, 1967, 1971, 1973, 1981, 1983, 1985
Espirito Santo Trophy (representing Great Britain & Ireland): 1966, 1968, 1972, 1980, 1982
Commonwealth Trophy (representing Great Britain): 1971 (winners)

Honours
 Appointed a Member of the Order of the British Empire for services to golf
 Voted "Scottish Sportswoman of the Year" four times
 Voted "Women Golfer of the Year" three times
 Inducted into the Scottish Sports Hall of Fame in 2002
 Became one of the first female members of The Royal and Ancient Golf Club of St Andrews in February 2015
Inducted into Scottish Women in Sport Hall of Fame in 2018

References

Scottish female golfers
Amateur golfers
Winners of ladies' major amateur golf championships
Members of the Order of the British Empire
1936 births
Living people